Enso can refer to:
Ensō, a Japanese word meaning "circle".
El Niño–Southern Oscillation (ENSO), the climate phenomenon commonly known as El Niño.
Stora Enso, a Finnish–Swedish pulp and paper manufacturer.
Enso (town), the Finnish name of the Russian town Svetogorsk.
Enso Quartet, a US-based string quartet.
Enso (software), a language-based service-oriented software invented by Aza Raskin.
, a Finnish cargo ship in service 1950-59
Enso Group, an Indian company

See also 
 Enzo, an Italian given name